Prevention of the lawful and decent burial of a dead body is an offence under the common law of England, Wales and Northern Ireland. Outside of homicide (to be an added count) it is quite rare. It is triable by indictment and can be punished by, at maximum, life imprisonment, an unlimited fine or both.

An example of the offence, standalone, is detaining a body, for instance upon a claim for fees or a debt, refusing to deliver it to the executors for burial, or when entrusted with it for burial selling for dissection. 

Burning a body instead of burying it was not illegal. It is now an offence to burn a body otherwise than in an approved crematorium.

Disposing of the dead body of a child with intent to conceal the birth (regardless as to when the child died) is a different offence; that under section 60 of the Offences Against the Person Act 1861.

Recent cases
Hans Kristian Rausing, heir to Hans Rausing who owns the multinational food packaging and processing company Tetra Pak, was charged with the offence on 17 July 2012 after police discovered the corpse of his wife, Eva. He received a suspended prison sentence.

Nathan Matthews and his girlfriend, Shauna Hoare were charged then convicted with this after murdering Becky Watts; the defence team received substantial legal aid principally due to the absence of witnesses of the killing.

References

Crimes 
Common law offences in England and Wales
English criminal law
Burials in the United Kingdom